Prikrita harmonija is a novel by Slovenian author Katarina Marinčič. It was first published in 2001.

See also
List of Slovenian novels

References

Slovenian novels
2001 novels